The Nui Chua bent-toed gecko (Cyrtodactylus sangi) is a species of lizard in the family Gekkonidae. The species is endemic to Vietnam.

Etymology
The specific epithet sangi honors Vietnamese herpetologist Ngoc Sang Nguyen, who has helped the herpetological community with its work in the taxonomy and understanding of the Cyrtodactylus.

Geographic range
C. sangi is found in southern Vietnam, in Ninh Thuan Province.

Description
C. sangi can be differentiated from its congeners by its small size, snout-to-vent length 56.3 mm (2.22 in), absence of the precloacal groove, transversally enlarged medium subcaudal scales, and the presence of irregular rows to the midbody, among other characteristics.

Reproduction
The mode of reproduction of C. sangi is unknown.

References

sangi
Reptiles described in 2018